KROA (95.7 FM) is a radio station broadcasting a Christian contemporary format. Licensed to Grand Island, Nebraska, United States, the station serves the Grand Island-Kearney area.  The station is currently owned by My Bridge Radio.

KROA is the flagship station of the "My Bridge Radio" network of Christian radio stations in Nebraska. Other full-power stations in the network include KRKR Lincoln, KQIQ Beatrice, KPNY Alliance, KZLW Gretna, KMBV Valentine, KHZY Overton, and KSSH Shubert.  The range of each station (except KMBV, KSSH, and KQIQ) is also extended via a network of translators.

My Bridge Radio also owns 750 KMMJ and 104.7 K284DC in Grand Island, Nebraska, which broadcast in Spanish.

My Bridge Radio Network

Translators

References

External links

ROA